= Contrived tenancy =

A contrived tenancy is a term used in British housing law to describe a situation where a tenancy is created in order to take advantage of the housing benefit system. Contrived tenancies can occur where a family member 'rents' to a family member but on a non-commercial basis. Contrived tenancies also exist if a landlord only asks for rent when a tenant is not working and so is entitled to Housing Benefit but not when a tenant is working.
